Rainy Day was an all-star Paisley Underground band, a collaborative project composed of members of Los Angeles-based bands including Dream Syndicate, The Three O'Clock, Rain Parade and The Bangles.

They began collaborating after meeting at a barbecue hosted by members of Green on Red. Rainy Day recorded and released an eponymous album in 1984. It pays tribute to various psychedelic and folk rock acts, and included covers of songs by Bob Dylan, The Beach Boys, Neil Young (with Buffalo Springfield), Big Star, The Velvet Underground, The Who and Jimi Hendrix.

Band members

Steve Wynn
Karl Precoda
Kendra Smith
Dennis Duck
Michael Quercio
Louis Gutierrez (a.k.a. Gregg Gutierrez)
Mickey Mariano
Danny Benair
Steven Roback
David Roback
Matt Piucci
Eddie Kalwa
Will Glenn
Vicki Peterson
Susanna Hoffs

Discography

 Rainy Day (1984)

External links
 Rainy Day on All Music Guide

Jangle pop groups
Alternative rock groups from California